Leon Jooste (born 18 February 1969 in Grootfontein, Otjozondjupa Region) is a Namibian politician and businessperson who  serves as Minister of Public Enterprises.

Education and early life
Jooste attended school at Paul Roos Gymnasium in Stellenbosch and at Abbott's College in Cape Town, both South Africa. In 1991 he graduated from Stellenbosch University with a BA in archaeology and anthropology. He is a professional helicopter pilot since 1993, and upon his return to Namibia became managing director of Eden Wildlife Trust, a tourism enterprise near Grootfontein.

Political career
A member of SWAPO, Jooste was appointed to replace Gerhard Tötemeyer in the National Assembly of Namibia. He entered the National Assembly in 2004 after being elected on the SWAPO Party list in the 2004 general election. He was appointed Deputy Minister for Local and Regional Government the same year. In 2005, he was shifted to the Environment and Tourism portfolio in Hifikepunye Pohamba's first cabinet, again as deputy minister.

Jooste resigned in late 2009 in order to take over the family business in Cape Town after the death of his father.

Under president Hage Geingob, Jooste was appointed as Minister of Public Enterprises in March 2015. Decisions under his reign were often controversial and unpopular and included the closures of state-owned Air Namibia and the Road Contractor's Company. In 2021 he suggested that the ministry he heads should be downgraded to a department within the Ministry of Finance, effectively abolishing his own ministerial position.

References

1969 births
Government ministers of Namibia
Living people
Members of the National Assembly (Namibia)
People from Grootfontein
Stellenbosch University alumni
SWAPO politicians
White Namibian people